Martin O'Neill (born 1992) is an Irish hurler who plays for Waterford Senior Championship club Mount Sion. He previously lined out with the Waterford senior hurling team.

Career

O'Neill first played hurling at juvenile and underage levels with Mount Sion before eventually progressing onto the club's senior team. He simultaneously lined out with the Waterford Institute of Technology in the Fitzgibbon Cup. O'Neill first appeared on the inter-county scene as captain of the Waterford minor hurling team that won the Munster MHC title in 2009. He later lined out with the under-21 team. O'Neill was still a member of the minor team when he was drafted onto the Waterford senior hurling team as a member of the extended training panel in 2010. He was part of the team that won the National Hurling League in 2015.

Career statistics

Honours

Mount Sion
Waterford Junior A Football Championship: 2021

Waterford
National Hurling League: 2015
Munster Minor Hurling Championship: 2009

References

1992 births
Living people
Mount Sion hurlers
Waterford inter-county hurlers